Santa María del Mar is a sandy beach located  east of Havana, Cuba along the Via Blanca highway.

Overview
It is a segment of a chain of beaches called the Eastern Beaches  which extend for  along the north coast of Havana province in the municipality of Habana del Este. 

Beaches of Cuba
Geography of Havana
Tourist attractions in Havana